Shaykh Muhammad al-Khalili (died 1734) was an Islamic scholar who served as the Shafi'i mufti of Jerusalem in the early eighteenth century. Historian Rashid Khalidi describes him as "one of the most eminent eighteenth-century religious figures in Jerusalem."

See also 

 Islamic leadership in Jerusalem

References 

People from Jerusalem
History of Jerusalem
Shafi'i fiqh scholars
Muftis
Palestinian scholars
History of Islam
1734 deaths